Frescobaldi may refer to:

 Frescobaldi – a prominent family from Italy
 Girolamo Frescobaldi – the Italian Baroque composer
 Jerome Frescobaldi – Italian merchant based in Bruges who supplied James IV of Scotland
 Frescobaldi (software) – music notation software for editing LilyPond format